Ornipholidotos abriana is a butterfly in the family Lycaenidae. It is found in the Central African Republic and the northern part of the Democratic Republic of the Congo. The habitat consists of forests.

References

Butterflies described in 2005
Taxa named by Michel Libert
Ornipholidotos